Coleophora cochleata is a moth of the family Coleophoridae.

References

cochleata
Moths described in 2005